Heineken Srbija is a Serbian brewery based in Zaječar. It is owned by the Dutch brewing company Heineken International.

History
The Dutch brewing company Heineken International entered the Serbian market in July 2007. Soon after entering the market, it purchased several breweries in Serbia and became one of the largest companies in the Serbian brewing market.

In December 2007, Heineken bought the Serbian brewery Rodić MB for an undisclosed amount. At the time, Rodić MB with 282 employees had a total equity of 145 million euros and annual revenues of 18.5 million euros. With the purchase, Heineken became the third-largest brewing company in Serbia, behind Apatin Brewery and Carlsberg Srbija. After the acquisition, the company changed its name to "Heineken's Braurei MB".

In June 2008, Heineken bought 72% of shares of the Serbian brewing company "Efes Srbija", controlled by the Turkish Efes Pilsen. Efes Srbija had "Zaječar Brewery" and "Pančevo Brewery" in its ownership. Following the acquisition, the company operated under name to "Ujedinjene srpske pivare" (United Breweries of Serbia) and later renamed to "Heineken Srbija".

Organization

 Novi Sad Brewery

Sponsorships
Heineken Srbija is the main sponsor of summer music festival Lovefest.

See also
 Zaječarsko pivo

References

External links
 

Breweries of Serbia
Companies based in Zaječar
Food and drink companies established in 2007
D.o.o. companies in Serbia
Heineken
Serbian brands
Serbian companies established in 2007